The North Carolina School for the Deaf (NCSD) is a state-supported residential school for deaf children established in 1894, in Morganton, North Carolina, US.

History 

In 1845, W.D. Cooke was hired by the state and a school was opened in Raleigh with seven deaf pupils. The school remained open during the American Civil War, then later suffered under the incompetent leadership of political appointees.

Around 1890 the education trend in the United States was to have separate schools for deaf children and blind children. This led to a series of hearings that, in turn, led to legislative action. The result was funding for a new school for deaf children and its location in Morganton, both in 1891. The prime advocate for a new school was Edward McKee Goodwin (1859–1937) of Raleigh who, in 1894, became the first superintendent, an appointment he held until 1936. The person instrumental for the location in Morganton was Col. Samuel McDowell Tate (1830–1897) of Morganton. The school for the blind remained in Raleigh as The Governor Morehead School.

During the Civil War, Confederate money was printed at the school.

Under desegregation in the 1960s, black deaf students from the Garner campus of Governor Morehead School were moved to NCSD.

Due to declining student populations, there were considerations on whether to close the school in 1986, 1991, and 2000, but the school remained open.

Today 
The school now has an annual budget of over $10 million. The historic district encompasses 14 historic buildings constructed between about 1891 and 1939. They include the main building, classroom buildings, recreational facilities, the original
infirmary, staff housing, and farm buildings. They representations of Victorian, Romanesque Revival, Colonial Revival style architecture. The main building is a high Victorian three-story brick building with a slate roof and five-story tower.   The Main Building was listed on the National Register of Historic Places in 1976 and the historic district in 1989.

North Carolina School for the Deaf and Blind is one of two primary public schools for Deaf and hard of hearing students in Pre-K through 12th grade in North Carolina. The school offers an education program as well as vocational rehabilitation service on campus for students after graduation.

It is accredited by the Southern Association of Colleges and Schools and the Conference of Educational Administrators Serving the Deaf.

The North Carolina School for the Deaf Historical Museum is located on the campus of the school for the Deaf at Morganton, NC.  The original site was in the Historic Main Building common room before it was moved to the former Superintendent's Home in 2003. The Museum was spearheaded as a Senior Project by Jimmy Autrey, NCSD graduate of 1977 along with a number of student & staff volunteers.  The Museum displays a historical timeline of pictures & artifacts pertaining to the establishment of the North Carolina School for the Deaf in 1891 as well as the original NC Institution for the Deaf & Blind in 1845 & the NC Institution for Colored Deaf & Blind in 1869, both at Raleigh, NC.  The Museum maintains a record of student enrollment, organizational activities, school publications, memorabilia, photographic images, newspapers & class books in the Archival Collection Room.  Currently, the Archives have over 1000 pictures with the state of the art computerized storage for research purposes & exhibition.

Campus
The school has dormitory facilities.

See also
 Eastern North Carolina School for the Deaf

References

External links

 North Carolina School for the Deaf
 History of North Carolina School for the Deaf
 North Carolina Office of Education Services
  North Carolina School for the Deaf Historical Museum
 North Carolina School for the Deaf Biennial Reports in the North Carolina Digital Collections
 North Carolina School for the Deaf Biennial Reports in the State Library of North Carolina Collection of the Internet Archive
Outline of Work, 1929, North Carolina School for the Deaf, Morgantown, N.C. in the State Library of North Carolina Collection of the Internet Archive
Otis Betts, The North Carolina School for the Deaf at Morganton, 1894–1944 : the education of the deaf in North Carolina, 1845–1945, 1945 in the State Library of North Carolina Collection of the Internet Archive

Schools for the deaf in the United States
Schools in Burke County, North Carolina
Public high schools in North Carolina
Public middle schools in North Carolina
Public elementary schools in North Carolina
Public K-12 schools in the United States
School buildings on the National Register of Historic Places in North Carolina
Victorian architecture in North Carolina
Romanesque Revival architecture in North Carolina
Colonial Revival architecture in North Carolina
Buildings and structures in Burke County, North Carolina
National Register of Historic Places in Burke County, North Carolina
Historic districts on the National Register of Historic Places in North Carolina
Public boarding schools in the United States
Boarding schools in North Carolina